Kai Nielsen (May 15, 1926 – April 7, 2021) was an American professor, latterly emeritus, of philosophy at the University of Calgary. He specialized in naturalism, metaphilosophy, ethics, analytic philosophy, social and political philosophy. Nielsen also wrote about  philosophy of religion, and was an advocate of contemporary atheism. He was also known for his defense of utilitarianism, writing in response to Bernard Williams's criticism of it.

Biography
Born on May 15, 1926 in Marshall, Michigan, Kai Edward Nielsen was raised in Moline, Illinois.

Nielsen achieved his AB honors at the University of North Carolina at Chapel Hill, and, in 1959, his PhD at Duke University.

Before moving to the University of Calgary, Nielsen held appointments at Amherst College and New York University. 

Nielsen was a member of the Royal Society of Canada and a past president (in 1983) of the Canadian Philosophical Association. 

Nielsen was also one of the founding members of the Canadian Journal of Philosophy.

In 1973 Nielsen was one of the signers of the Humanist Manifesto II.

He wrote or edited over 40 books on topics such as Marxism, metaphilosophy and ethical and political theory.

Nielsen died in April 2021 at the age of 94.

Publications

Books 
Pessimism of the Intellect, Optimism of the Will: The Political Philosophy of Kai Nielsen, Edited by David Rondel and Alex Sager, 2012, 
Wittgensteinian Fideism?, 2006,   (with D. Z. Philips)
Atheism And Philosophy, 2005, 
Globalization And Justice, 2002, 
Naturalism and Religion, 2001, 
Exploitation, 2001, 
Why Be Moral?, 1997, 
Naturalism Without Foundations, 1996, 4
On Transforming Philosophy: A Metaphilosophical Inquiry, 1995, 
Does God Exist?: The Debate Between Theists and Atheists (with J. P. Moreland), 1993, 
God and the Grounding Of Morality,  1991, 
After the Demise of the Tradition: Rorty, Critical Theory, and the Fate of Philosophy, 1991, 
Ethics without God, 1990, 
God, Skepticism and Modernity, 1989, 
Marxism and the Moral Point of View: Morality, Ideology, and Historical Materialism, 1989, 
Equality and Liberty: A Defense of Radical Egalitarianism, 1986, 
Philosophy and Atheism, 1985, 
An Introduction to the Philosophy of Religion, 1983, 
Marx and Morality, 1981, 
Scepticism, 1973, 

 Ethics Without God, 1973, revised edition 1990. 

Reason and Practice: A Modern Introduction to Philosophy, 1971, 
Contemporary Critiques of Religion, 1971, 
Ethics Without God, 1971,

Articles and book chapters 
see listings at Nielsen's personal home page, Calgary home page, and details at Philpapers.

See also
Existence of God
New York University Department of Philosophy

References

Sources
 Pojman, L. The Moral Life, OUP, 2001.

External links 
Kai Nielsen's bibliography and archives
 Transcript of debate with theist William Lane Craig
 Nielsen page at Calgary 

1926 births
2021 deaths
20th-century atheists
21st-century atheists
American atheists
Atheism in Canada
Atheist philosophers
Academic staff of Concordia University
Consequentialists
Critics of religions
Duke University alumni
People from Marshall, Michigan
People from Moline, Illinois
Philosophers from Illinois
Philosophers from Michigan
Philosophers of religion
Political philosophers
Social philosophers
Academic staff of the University of Calgary
Utilitarians
Rationalists
Presidents of the Canadian Philosophical Association